Alainodaeus is a genus of crabs in the family Xanthidae, containing the following species:

 Alainodaeus akiaki Davie, 1992
 Alainodaeus alis Davie, 1997
 Alainodaeus nuku Davie, 1997
 Alainodaeus rimatara Davie, 1992

References

Xanthoidea